Þór Whitehead (Thor Whitehead) (born 19 August 1943) is an Icelandic historian. He is currently a professor at the University of Iceland.

Thor has written extensively on the history of Iceland during World War II and the Cold War. His best known work is the multi-volume series Ísland í síðari heimsstyrjöld (Iceland in the Second World War). He has also written about other episodes in Icelandic history, such as the Icelandic government's rejection of Jewish refugees during the war, and the racist policies of banning black soldiers from the American-garrisoned Naval Air Station Keflavik.

Education
Thor received a BA degree from the University of Iceland, an MA from the University of Georgia and his DPhil from Oxford University.

Academic career
 Research lecturer, University of Iceland, 1978–1981
 Professor of history, University of Iceland, Reykjavík, Iceland, 1981-
 Director, Institute of History, University of Iceland, 1983–1985
 Fulbright Research Fellow and Visiting Scholar, School of Advanced International Studies, Johns Hopkins University, Washington, DC, United States, 1986
 Humboldt Fellow, Militärgeschichtliches Forschungsamt der Bundeswehr, Freiburg, Germany, 1986–1988
 Dean, Faculty of Arts, University of Iceland, 1989–1991
 Visiting Research Professor, Université Paul-Valéry, Montpellier III, Montpellier, France, 1992–1993
 Chairman, Department of History, 1994–1995
 Humboldt Fellow, Militärgeschichtliches Forschungsamt der Bundeswehr, Freiburg, Germany, 1996–1997
 Visiting Research Professor, Université Paul-Valéry, Montpellier III, Montpellier, France, 2002–2003, 2005–2006,
 Chairman, Department of History and Archaeology, University of Iceland 2006–2007

Publications
 
  The Icelandic Literary Prize, 1995.
 
 
  The Icelandic Booksellers Prize, 2002.

Sources

 Who is Who in the World 2009.

External links
 Interview in the Reykjavik Grapevine
 Þór Whitehead's website at the University of Iceland

1943 births
Living people
Thor Whitehead
University of Georgia alumni
Alumni of the University of Oxford
Thor Whitehead
Thor Whitehead